Sunshine on Leith is a stage musical featuring the songs of The Proclaimers and written by Stephen Greenhorn for the Dundee Rep Ensemble and first performed in 2007. The show won the TMA Award for Best Musical that year and has toured several times since.

A film adaptation was completed in 2013, and screened in the Special Presentation section at the 2013 Toronto International Film Festival.

The West Yorkshire Playhouse staged a new production in 2018, directed by James Brining. A production of the musical by Green Room Productions is set to be staged at Wyllyotts Theatre in Potters Bar in May 2022.

References

2007 musicals
Jukebox musicals
British musicals
The Proclaimers